Riejanne Markus (born 1 September 1994) is a Dutch professional racing cyclist, who currently rides for UCI Women's Continental Team . In 2022, Markus won the Dutch National Road Race Championships.

Major results

Road

2015
 5th Road race, UEC European Under-23 Championships
 7th Parel van de Veluwe
2016
 5th Overall BeNe Ladies Tour
 9th Team time trial, Crescent Vårgårda UCI Women's WorldTour
 10th Overall Giro del Trentino Alto Adige-Südtirol
2017
 1st  Overall Gracia–Orlová
1st Stages 1 & 3 (ITT)
 1st Omloop van Borsele
 5th 7-Dorpenomloop Aalburg
 7th Team time trial, Crescent Vårgårda UCI Women's WorldTour
2018
 4th Amstel Gold Race
 5th Team time trial, Tour of Norway
 6th Team time trial, Crescent Vårgårda UCI Women's WorldTour
 7th Overall Belgium Tour
 9th Overall Healthy Ageing Tour
2019
 1st  Team relay, UCI World Championships
 1st  Team relay, UEC European Championships
 5th Time trial, National Championships
 6th Overall Grand Prix Elsy Jacobs
 8th Crescent Vårgårda UCI Women's WorldTour
 9th Overall Tour of Norway
2021
 UCI World Championships
2nd  Team relay
9th Time trial
 5th Time trial, UEC European Championships
 5th Time trial, National Championships
 7th Overall Tour of Norway
1st Stage 2
 9th Overall Festival Elsy Jacobs
2022
 National Championships
1st  Road race
2nd Time trial
 1st Stage 4 Simac Ladies Tour
 2nd Overall Bloeizone Fryslân Tour
 3rd  Time trial, UEC European Championships
2023
 8th Strade Bianche

Mountain Bike

2017
 1st  Beach race, UEC European Championships
2018
 2nd  Beach race, UEC European Championships
2019
 2nd  Beach race, UEC European Championships
2021
 2nd  Beach race, UEC European Championships

References

External links
 

1994 births
Living people
Dutch female cyclists
People from Diemen
Cyclists from North Holland
21st-century Dutch women
UCI Road World Champions (women)